Victor Mahaña Badrie (12 August 1922 – 6 September 2001) was a Chilean basketball player. He competed in the men's tournament at the 1948 Summer Olympics, the 1952 Summer Olympics and the 1956 Summer Olympics.

References

External links
 

1922 births
2001 deaths
Chilean men's basketball players
1954 FIBA World Championship players
Olympic basketball players of Chile
Basketball players at the 1948 Summer Olympics
Basketball players at the 1952 Summer Olympics
Basketball players at the 1956 Summer Olympics
Sportspeople from Santiago
1950 FIBA World Championship players